Sewer King may refer to:
Sewer Evil King
Sewer King (Batman), a minor character from the animated series